The Bajalan tribe, are an ethnic Kurdish Bajelani speaking tribe.

Ethnology
Their ethnonym means "home of the falcons". The tribe originates from Abdal Bey, an Ottoman commander in the Ottoman–Safavid War (1623–39).

Geography
The seat of the Bajalan Pashas was Zohab which they founded according to James Silk Buckingham. SARPUL-I ZOHAB ("bridgehead of Zohab"), a place on the way to Zagros on the great Baghdad-Kirmanshah road, takes its name from the stone bridge of two arches over the river Alwand. Austen Henry Layard observes the river Holwan issues at Ser-puli-Zohab from a deep gorge through lofty precipices. The Bajalan Pass was noted by foreign travelers for its monasteries, bridges, castles and aqueducts.

History

17th century
The Bajalans, under the command of their leader Abdal Bey, participated on the side of the Ottomans in the Ottoman–Safavid War (1623–39); numbered some 4000, they fought successfully against the Persians and helped Sultan Murad IV conquer Baghdad in 1638.

Murad IV, in recognition of services rendered to the Ottoman Empire in the capture of Baghdad, rewarded Abdal Bey and his descendants with the title of Pasha (of one tail) and hereditary rights to the newly established Zohab Pashalik under the Treaty of Zuhab of 1639. The Sultan ceded Zohab to Abdal Bey on the condition that he sols raise 2,000 horsemen when required, and pay a yearly tribute of 300,000 piastres to the State. However, in reality as an Ottoman vassal, they were lightly taxed and furnished a body of 1,200 horsemen to the crown. David McDowall described the Bajalans as formidable fighters and George Bournoutian stated that their sheer looks brought on terror to the enemy in their chain mail.  Sir Henry Rawlinson, 1st Baronet notes the Kalhur tribe were ousted from Zohab by Sultan Murad IV who gave their lands to the Bajalan tribe. 

The pashalik of Zohab was a district of considerable extent, lying at the foot of the ancient Zagros, the capital was surrounded by a mud wall. The Pashalik was dependent upon that of Bagdad, and consisted of two divisions, Derna and Zehav. The Bajalan tribe was made up of a confederacy of lesser sub-tribes who were loyal to the Bajalan family and its Pasha, the first main sub tribe was Jumur (Jomur) which itself had nine branches including Hajilar, Gharibawand, Shirawand (Siravand), Charkalao, Mamawand, Daudawand (Dandavand), Zorkh (Sorkh) and Jalil Agha, the second main tribe was Qazanlu which had three branches, Haji Khalil, Wali Agha, Abdurrahman Agha. George Nathaniel Curzon mentions the Sagwands in his book Persia and the Persian question.

18th century
A Bajilan Pasha moved against and fought Nadir Shah of Persia in Pataq and Zohab in January 1733. Nadir Shah subsequently expelled a part of Bajalan's tribe to Khurramabad. The Bajalans became embroiled in the civil wars which were unleashed by the death of Karim Khan Zand in 1779.

19th century
Robert Curzon British Commissioner in Erzurum noted that Osman Pasha in 1843 was the seventh hereditary Pasha of the Bajalan family.

20th century
Rashid Pasha was the founding member of the first Kurdish political party in Iraq, Hiwa. Later, he was appointed a member of the central committee of the KDP on August 16, 1946 in Baghdad.

Language

Members of the ruling begzadas Bajilan family spoke Kurmanji as well as a dialect of Gurani.

Bajilan Pashas 

Abdullah Pasha Bajalan
Mustafa Pasha Bajalan

References

Bibliography
 Syncretistic Religious Communities in the Near East, Krisztina Kehl-Bodrogi, Barbara Kellner-Heinkele, Anke Otter-Beaujean.
 The Kurdish National Movement: Its Origins and Development, Wadie Jwaideh.
 Encyclopædia Iranica, Volume 3, Ehsan Yar-Shater.
 Bulletin of the School of Oriental and African Studies, Volume 11, University of London, School of Oriental and African Studies.
 Records of Iraq, 1914–1966, Volume 1, Alan de Lacy Rush, Jane Priestland.

Kurdish tribes
Kurds in Iraq
Kurds in Iran